Mere Humdam is a Pakistani drama serial which first aired on Hum TV on 26 January 2019. It was created by Momina Duraid and produced by their production company MD Productions. The show stars Syed Jibran, Sarah Khan, and Goher Mumtaz. The show ended on 9 July 2019.

Cast
Syed Jibran as Usama
Goher Mumtaz as Haris
Sarah Khan as Warda
Mashal Khan as Paras
Natalia Awais as Aiman                                   
Nida Mumtaz as Warda's mother
Humaira Bano as Usama's mother 
Fazila Qazi as Haris's mother
Khalid Bin Shaheen as Zaidi (Haris's father)
Jahanara Hai as Zaidi's mother (Haris's grandmother)

Soundtrack 

The title song was sung by Gohar Mumtaz & Amna Abbas. The music was composed by Gohar Mumtaz  and the lyrics were written by Gohar Mumtaz.

References

External links
Official website

2019 Pakistani television series debuts